Amasya station is a railway station in Turkey. It was built in 1927.

It is on the main railway connecting Samsun (north) to Sivas (south). Main passenger train service is the Samsun-Amasya Regional.

References

Railway stations in Amasya Province
Buildings and structures in Amasya Province
Railway stations opened in 1927
Transport in Amasya Province